Louis Walter George Marchant (5 July 1916 – 1983) was an English diver who competed for England. Marchant won a bronze medal in the 10 Metres Platform at the 1934 British Empire Games in London. He also competed in the men's 10 metre platform event at the 1948 Summer Olympics.

References

1916 births
1983 deaths
English male divers
Divers at the 1934 British Empire Games
Commonwealth Games medallists in diving
Commonwealth Games bronze medallists for England
Olympic divers of Great Britain
Divers at the 1948 Summer Olympics
20th-century English people
Medallists at the 1934 British Empire Games